Dinko Horkaš (born 10 March 1999) is a Croatian professional footballer who plays as a goalkeeper for Bulgarian club Lokomotiv Plovdiv.

Club career
Horkaš started playing football in HNK Segesta in his native Sisak, before moving to the GNK Dinamo Zagreb Academy, aged 12. Since late 2016, Horkaš started playing for the Dinamo Zagreb reserve team, featuring also in Dinamo's UEFA Youth League 2016/17 and 2018/19 campaigns. After featuring in 68 matches for the second-tier reserves, he was loaned out to Zrinjski Mostar at the beginning of 2020, as backup for the injured Ivan Brkić His loan was renewed in the summer of 2020, and featured in 8 matches overall for the team before Brkić recovered. With further playing time becoming unlikely, his loan was cancelled in October 2020. The same month, Horkaš moved on to a loan to NK Varaždin.

On 5 July 2022, Horkaš joined Lokomotiv Plovdiv, signing a two-year contract.

International career
Horkaš amassed 26 caps for Croatia's youth teams between 2014 and 2019.

In November 2022, Bulgarian media reported that Horkaš is applying for Bosnia and Herzegovina passport as his family is from there.  <ref>

References

External links

1999 births
Living people
People from Sisak
Association football goalkeepers
Croatian footballers
Croatia youth international footballers
Croatia under-21 international footballers
GNK Dinamo Zagreb II players
HŠK Zrinjski Mostar players
NK Varaždin players
HŠK Posušje players
Croatian Football League players
First Football League (Croatia) players
Premier League of Bosnia and Herzegovina players
Croatian expatriate footballers
Expatriate footballers in Bosnia and Herzegovina
Croatian expatriate sportspeople in Bosnia and Herzegovina
Expatriate footballers in Bulgaria
Croatian expatriate sportspeople in Bulgaria